The Wicker Man is a 2006 horror film written and directed by Neil LaBute and starring Nicolas Cage. It is a remake and reimagining of the 1973 British film The Wicker Man, but also draws from its source material, David Pinner's 1967 novel Ritual. The film concerns police officer Edward Malus, whose ex-fiancée Willow Woodward informs him that her daughter Rowan has disappeared and asks for his help in her search. When he arrives at the island in the Pacific Northwest where Rowan was last seen, he suspects something sinister about the neo-pagans who live there. The film received negative reviews on Metacritic, and Rotten Tomatoes' critical consensus calls it unintentionally funny. The film grossed $39 million on a $40 million production budget.

Plot
Policeman Edward Malus gets news from his ex-fiancée, Willow Woodward, that her daughter Rowan is missing. He travels to an island off the coast of Washington state where a group of neo-pagans live. The island is led by Sister Summersisle (Ellen Burstyn), an elderly woman who represents the goddess they worship. Sister Summersisle explains to Edward that her ancestors had left England to avoid persecution only to settle near Salem and find renewed persecution in the Salem witch trials before arriving on the island. Sister Summersisle explains that their population is predominantly female, as they choose the strongest stock—evading Edward's concern about the birth of unwanted males. The island's economy relies on the production of local honey, which Edward learns has declined recently.

Edward asks the villagers about Rowan, but they give him evasive answers. He later sees two men carrying a large bag that appears to be dripping blood and finds a fresh, unmarked grave in the churchyard. The grave turns out to contain only a burned doll, but Edward finds Rowan's sweater in the churchyard. At the village school, teacher Sister Rose tries to prevent Edward from seeing the class register. When he sees that Rowan's name has been crossed out, he becomes outraged at the teacher's and Rowan's classmates' lies. Rose insists that Edward talk with her outside. After a short discussion of the island people's view of death, she explains that capital punishment is used to enforce their laws. Edward asks how Rowan died and Sister Rose tells him, "She'll burn to death." When Edward catches the tense she used, Sister Rose quickly corrects herself: "She burned to death." When Edward questions Willow about the grave, she reveals that Rowan is their daughter together. On the day of the fertility rite, Edward frantically searches the village for Rowan. Disguised in a bear suit, he joins the parade led by Sister Summersisle, which ends at the site of the festival.

Rowan is tied to a large tree, about to be burned. Edward rescues her and they run away through the woods, but Rowan leads him back to Sister Summersisle. Sister Summersisle thanks Rowan for her help, and Edward realizes that the search for Rowan was a setup the whole time. It is revealed that Willow, known on the island as Sister Willow, is the daughter of Sister Summersisle and that Willow sealed Edward's fate many years ago, when Sister Willow chose him as a human sacrifice to restore the island's honey production (after Edward deliberately destroyed the beehives in their crop earlier). The villagers tackle and overpower Edward, viciously breaking his legs to prevent him from escaping and "torturing" him with live bees (shown in the alternate version). They carry him to an enormous wicker man where he's hoisted high above the ground and shut inside. Rowan sets fire to the wicker man, and Edward is sacrificed in a giant blaze amid his screams.

Six months later, Sister Willow and Honey go to a bar and meet two policemen, one of them having graduated from the academy. Willow and Honey agree to go home with them.

Cast

Production
Universal Pictures had been planning a remake of the 1973 film of the same name since the 1990s. The British film had been in the licensing library of Canal+, which was optioned by producer JoAnne Sellar to Universal. In March 2002 it was revealed that Neil LaBute was writing and directing The Wicker Man for Universal and Nicolas Cage's production company Saturn Films. Around the same time, the original film's director Robin Hardy and star Christopher Lee were preparing a semi-remake of their 1973 film, titled The Riding of the Laddie, with Vanessa Redgrave and Lee's Lord of the Rings co-star Sean Astin attached. Hardy stated Lee would not play the villain as he did in the original Wicker Man, but instead a door-to-door born again Christian preacher who comes to Scotland along with his wife (Redgrave) as they are introduced to the neo-pagan cult. Hardy hoped for filming to begin in Glasgow, Scotland in 2003, but The Riding of the Laddie would not materialize until years later, when it had undergone many changes to become the film The Wicker Tree. Universal's remake with LaBute moved forward, who changed the Scots setting to contemporary America. The remake rights eventually moved from Universal to Millennium Films. Filming began in Vancouver, Canada in July 2005. Millennium sold distribution rights to Alcon Entertainment for distribution through their output deal with Warner Bros. Pictures.

Reception

Critical response
On review aggregator Rotten Tomatoes, the film has an approval rating of 15% based on 108 reviews and an average rating of 3.70/10. The website's critics consensus says, "Puzzlingly misguided, Neil LaBute's update [of] The Wicker Man struggles against unintentional comedy and fails." On Metacritic, the film has a weighted average score of 36 out of 100, based on 19 critics, indicating "generally unfavorable reviews". Audiences polls by CinemaScore gave the film an average rating of "F" on an A+ to F scale.

On At the Movies, the film got two thumbs down from Richard Roeper and Aisha Tyler, although they both said the film was "entertainingly bad".  Owen Gleiberman of Entertainment Weekly wrote that the original film is overrated, but the remake's climax lacks its "tingle of madness".

The original film's director, Robin Hardy, had expressed skepticism over the Hollywood remake and had his lawyers make Warner Bros. remove his name from the remake's promotional material. According to Hardy, he was given writing credit for the screenplay when he had not received any for the original. Christopher Lee, who played Lord Summerisle in the original film, commented: "I don't believe in remakes. You can make a follow up to a film, but to remake a movie with such history and success just doesn't make sense to me."

Cage himself acknowledged that the film was "absurd". He remarked in 2010, "There is a mischievous mind at work on The Wicker Man, you know? You know what I mean? And I finally kind of said, 'I might have known that the movie was meant to be absurd.' But saying that now after the fact is OK, but to say it before the fact is not, because you have to let the movie have its own life." In February 2012, Cage gave a live webchat with fans to promote Ghost Rider: Spirit of Vengeance. When asked what roles from his career he would most like to revisit, Cage responded, "I would like to hook up with one of the great Japanese filmmakers, like the master that made Ringu, and I would like to take The Wicker Man to Japan, except this time he's a ghost.

The scenes where Nicolas Cage's character gets tortured by bees and where he discovers the burned doll have become internet memes.

Box office
The Wicker Man opened on September 1, 2006, in 2,784 venues and earned $9.6 million in its opening weekend, ranking third in the US box office. The film closed on November 16, 2006, after eleven weeks of release, grossing $23.6 million in the US and $15.1 million overseas for a worldwide total of $38.8 million.

Accolades
The film garnered five Golden Raspberry Award nominations but did not win any:
 Worst Picture – lost to Basic Instinct 2
 Worst Actor (Cage) – lost to Marlon and Shawn Wayans for Little Man
 Worst Screenplay (LaBute) – lost to Leora Barish and Henry Bean for Basic Instinct 2
 Worst Remake or Rip-off – lost to Little Man
 Worst On-Screen Couple (Cage and his bear suit) – lost to Shawn Wayans and either Kerry Washington or Marlon Wayans for Little Man

At the 2006 Stinkers Bad Movie Awards, the film garnered two nominations, one of which was a win:
 Worst Actor (Cage) – lost to Tim Allen for The Santa Clause 3: The Escape Clause, The Shaggy Dog, and Zoom
 Worst Remake – won

Home media

The film was released on DVD on December 19, 2006, with an unrated alternate ending included. The film continues in the same way as the theatrical version until the ending. Before Malus is taken to the wicker man to be burned alive, he is overpowered and tackled by villagers and sedated with a hive of bees, whose venom he is allergic to. The credits then begin after the wicker man's burning head falls off, omitting the "6 months later" scene. A Blu-ray of the film was released on January 30, 2007.

References

External links

 Official website archived from the original on June 15, 2006
 
 
 
 
 

2006 films
2006 horror films
2000s mystery horror films
American horror thriller films
American mystery thriller films
American remakes of British films
English-language German films
German horror thriller films
American dystopian films
2000s English-language films
Films about cults
Films about murder
American police films
Films about neopaganism
Films based on British novels
Films based on horror novels
Films based on mystery novels
Films scored by Angelo Badalamenti
Films directed by Neil LaBute
Films produced by Nicolas Cage
Films set in California
Films set in Washington (state)
Films set on fictional islands
Films shot in Vancouver
Horror film remakes
Films about human sacrifice
Religious horror films
Salem witch trials in fiction
Alcon Entertainment films
Warner Bros. films
American mystery horror films
Folk horror films
2000s mystery thriller films
2000s police films
Internet memes introduced in 2006
Film and television memes
Films produced by Boaz Davidson
2000s American films
2000s German films
Films about bees